Matteo Trentin (born 2 August 1989) is an Italian professional road cyclist, who currently rides for UCI WorldTeam .

Career

Professional career

In 2014, Trentin took a prestigious victory on Stage 7 of the Tour de France, where he won the sprint by a few centimeters over Peter Sagan. Trentin had also won a stage of the same race on his maiden Tour start in 2013, winning in a sprint in Lyon against his breakaway counterparts. In October 2015, Trentin won Paris–Tours in record time for a race over 200 km, thus becoming the new Ruban Jaune. By winning the fourth stage in the 2017 Vuelta a España, he completed the set of at least one stage win in each of the Grand Tours. He won three more stages and he was also in contention for the points jersey. But as Chris Froome was also sprinting unexpectedly, by managing to collect 5 points he was able to keep his leading position in the points competition too, and took the overall win from Trentin by only 2 points.

Trentin became European Champion by winning the road race at the 2018 European Cycling Championships in Glasgow. In 2019, Trentin took his third individual Tour de France stage win with a solo move from the breakaway on stage 17 into Gap.

Major results

Road

2010
 1st Stage 1 Giro del Friuli-Venezia Giulia
 2nd Trofeo Alcide Degasperi
 2nd Ruota d'Oro
 3rd Faè di Oderzo
 5th Trofeo Gianfranco Bianchin
 6th Trofeo Edil C
 7th Gran Premio della Liberazione
2011
 1st  Road race, National Under-23 Road Championships
 1st Gran Premio della Liberazione
 1st Trofeo Alcide Degasperi
 2nd Gran Premio Industrie del Marmo
 5th Ronde Van Vlaanderen Beloften
2012
 1st Gullegem Koerse
 9th Grote Prijs Jef Scherens
 10th Overall Driedaagse van West-Vlaanderen
 10th Le Samyn
2013
 1st Stage 14 Tour de France
2014
 1st Stage 7 Tour de France
 1st Stage 6 Tour de Suisse
 1st Stage 1 (TTT) Tirreno–Adriatico
 4th Trofeo Ses Salines
 9th Kuurne–Brussels–Kuurne
2015
 1st Paris–Tours
 Tour du Poitou-Charentes
1st  Points classification
1st Stages 2 & 5
 1st Stage 6 Tour of Britain
 2nd Gran Piemonte
 3rd E3 Harelbeke
 3rd Coppa Bernocchi
 6th Scheldeprijs
2016
 1st Stage 18 Giro d'Italia
 Tour de l'Ain
1st  Points classification
1st Stage 1
 Tour de Wallonie
1st  Points classification
1st Stage 4
 4th Paris–Tours
 4th Münsterland Giro
 5th Trofeo Felanitx–Ses Salines-Campos-Porreres
 9th EuroEyes Cyclassics
 9th Bretagne Classic
 10th Milan–San Remo
2017
 1st Paris–Tours
 1st Primus Classic
 Vuelta a España
1st Stages 4, 10, 13 & 21
 Combativity award Stage 10
Held  after Stages 4–8, 10–14
 1st Stage 2 Vuelta a Burgos
 2nd Binche–Chimay–Binche
 4th Road race, UCI Road World Championships
 4th Trofeo Laigueglia
 5th Kuurne–Brussels–Kuurne
 9th Omloop Het Nieuwsblad
2018
 1st  Road race, UEC European Road Championships
 1st Stage 5 Tour of Guangxi
 4th Vuelta a Murcia
 5th EuroEyes Cyclassics
 6th Gran Premio Bruno Beghelli
 7th Gent–Wevelgem
2019
 1st Trofeo Matteotti
 Tour de France
1st Stage 17
 Combativity award Stages 12 & 17
 Vuelta a Andalucía
1st Stages 2 & 5
 1st Stage 2 Volta a la Comunitat Valenciana
 2nd  Road race, UCI Road World Championships
 2nd Overall Tour of Britain
1st  Points classification
1st Stage 2
 7th Road race, UEC European Road Championships
 7th Overall Vuelta a Murcia
 7th E3 Binckbank Classic
 7th Gent–Wevelgem
 7th EuroEyes Cyclassics
 9th Omloop Het Nieuwsblad
 10th Milan–San Remo
 10th Amstel Gold Race
2020
 3rd Gent–Wevelgem
 4th Omloop Het Nieuwsblad
 6th Three Days of Bruges–De Panne
2021
 1st Trofeo Matteotti
 2nd Coppa Ugo Agostoni
 2nd Giro del Veneto
 3rd Gent–Wevelgem
 3rd Brabantse Pijl
 4th Road race, UEC European Road Championships
 4th Kuurne–Brussels–Kuurne
 4th Gran Piemonte
 4th Memorial Marco Pantani
 7th Grand Prix La Marseillaise
 8th Omloop Het Nieuwsblad
 9th Circuito de Getxo
  Combativity award Stage 10 Vuelta a España
2022
 1st Le Samyn
 1st Giro del Veneto
 2nd Vuelta a Murcia
 4th Coppa Bernocchi
 5th Road race, UCI Road World Championships
 5th Veneto Classic
 6th Overall Tour de Luxembourg
1st  Points classification
1st Stage 2
 7th Omloop Het Nieuwsblad
 9th Kuurne–Brussels–Kuurne
2023
 5th Vuelta a Murcia

Grand Tour general classification results timeline

Classics results timeline

Cyclo-cross

2005–2006
 3rd National Junior Championships
2006–2007
 1st  National Junior Championships
2009–2010
 3rd National Under-23 Championships
2010–2011
 UCI Under-23 World Cup
3rd Pont-Château
 3rd Fae' di Oderzo

See also
 List of riders with stage wins at all three cycling Grand Tours

References

External links

Matteo Trentin profile at Quick Step Floors

1989 births
Living people
Italian male cyclists
People from Borgo Valsugana
Italian Tour de France stage winners
Sportspeople from Trentino
2013 Tour de France stage winners
2014 Tour de France stage winners
Italian sportspeople in doping cases
Doping cases in cycling
Italian Giro d'Italia stage winners
Italian Vuelta a España stage winners
Cyclists from Trentino-Alto Adige/Südtirol
Tour de Suisse stage winners